Gustaf Fredrik "Jotte" Söderström (November 25, 1865 in Stockholm – November 12, 1958 in Lidingö) was a Swedish athlete and tug of war competitor.

He competed at the 1900 Summer Olympics and finished sixth in both shot put and discus throw. He also participated on the Dano-Swedish tug of war team which won the gold medal against opponents France. These were the first Olympic gold medals for Sweden.

See also
 Dual sport and multi-sport Olympians

References

External links

1865 births
1958 deaths
Athletes from Stockholm
Swedish male shot putters
Swedish male discus throwers
Athletes (track and field) at the 1900 Summer Olympics
Tug of war competitors at the 1900 Summer Olympics
Olympic athletes of Sweden
Olympic tug of war competitors of Sweden
Olympic gold medalists for Sweden
Olympic medalists in tug of war
Medalists at the 1900 Summer Olympics